Kandappa Jeyakody (born 29 August 1913) was a Sri Lankan Tamil politician and Member of Parliament.

Jeyakody was born on 29 August 1913.

Jeyakody stood as the Illankai Tamil Arasu Kachchi's (Federal Party) candidate in Udupiddy at the March 1960, July 1960 and 1965 parliamentary elections but on each occasion was defeated by the All Ceylon Tamil Congress candidate M. Sivasithamparam. He however won the 1970 parliamentary election and entered Parliament.

References

1913 births
Illankai Tamil Arasu Kachchi politicians
Members of the 7th Parliament of Ceylon
People from Northern Province, Sri Lanka
People from British Ceylon
Sri Lankan Tamil politicians
Year of death missing